The 2023 World Grand Prix (officially the 2023 Duelbits World Grand Prix) was a professional snooker tournament that took place from 16 to 22 January 2023 at The Centaur in Cheltenham, England. The eighth ranking event of the 2022–23 snooker season, it preceded the 2023 Players Championship and the 2023 Tour Championship as the first of three events in the Players Series. Sponsored for the first time by cryptocurrency casino Duelbits, the tournament was broadcast by ITV domestically, by Eurosport in Europe, and by Matchroom Sport and other broadcasters internationally. The winner received £100,000 from a total prize fund of £380,000. 

The participants were the top 32 players on the one-year ranking list as it stood after the 2022 English Open. Lu Ning was ineligible to compete after the sport's governing body suspended him amid a match-fixing investigation; his place went to David Gilbert. Four-time world champion John Higgins failed to qualify after finishing at 54th place on the one-year list following the English Open. 

The defending champion was Ronnie O'Sullivan, who defeated Neil Robertson 10–8 in the previous season's final. However, O'Sullivan lost 2–4 to Noppon Saengkham in the last 16. Facing Judd Trump in the final, Mark Allen won five consecutive frames to lead 7–2, but Trump won six of the next seven to tie the scores at 8–8. The match went to a deciding frame, where Allen clinched a 10–9 victory to win his ninth ranking title. It was Allen's third ranking tournament win of the season, following the 2022 Northern Ireland Open and 2022 UK Championship, and took him to a career-high of number three in the world rankings. Allen made the tournament's highest break of 141 in the 12th frame of the final.

Prize fund
The breakdown of prize money for the event is shown below:

 Winner: £100,000
 Runner-up: £40,000
 Semi-final: £20,000
 Quarter-final: £12,500
 Last 16: £7,500
 Last 32: £5,000
 Highest break: £10,000
 Total: £380,000

Seeding list
The top 32 players on the one-year ranking list, up to and including the 2022 English Open, qualified for the tournament. Seedings were based on the order of the players in that list.

The rankings are given below.

Tournament draw

Final

Century breaks
A total of 30 century breaks were made during the tournament.

 141, 133, 127, 105  Mark Allen
 140, 138, 117, 112, 108, 107  Judd Trump
 140, 100  Shaun Murphy
 133  Ding Junhui
 131, 108, 102  Anthony McGill
 122, 104  Noppon Saengkham
 121, 104, 100  Mark Williams
 117  Joe O'Connor
 113, 107  Sam Craigie
 109  Neil Robertson
 108  Ronnie O'Sullivan
 107, 104  Zhou Yuelong
 102  Jack Lisowski
 101  Ryan Day

References

2023 in snooker
Sport in Cheltenham
Snooker competitions in England
Players Series
January 2023 sports events in the United Kingdom
2023 in English sport